Simon Petrus Magakwe (25 May 1986 in Itsoseng) is a sprinter from South Africa. In 2010 he competed at the 2010 African Championships in Nairobi and won the bronze medal in both the 100 metres and the 200 metres. He was the first South African to run under 10 second, with a personal best of 9.98 seconds.

Doping rule violation
On 22 December 2014 Magakwe refused to submit to out-of-competition testing. He was subsequently handed a two-year ban from sport for the anti-doping rule violation.

References

1986 births
Living people
People from Ditsobotla Local Municipality
South African Tswana people
South African male sprinters
Doping cases in athletics
South African sportspeople in doping cases
Commonwealth Games competitors for South Africa
Athletes (track and field) at the 2014 Commonwealth Games
Universiade medalists in athletics (track and field)
Universiade gold medalists for South Africa
Medalists at the 2011 Summer Universiade
20th-century South African people
21st-century South African people